Andrew Lockington (born January 31, 1974) is a Canadian film score composer.

Life and career
Lockington was born in 1974 in Burlington, Ontario, Canada. He has composed the complete scores for over three dozen films, including Journey to the Center of the Earth (2008), City of Ember (2008), Percy Jackson: Sea of Monsters (2013), San Andreas (2015), and The Space Between Us (2017).

He received the Breakout Composer of the Year Award from the 2009 International Film Music Critics Association (IFMCA) Awards, for his scores for Journey to the Center of the Earth  and City of Ember. He was also nominated for Best Original Score for a Fantasy/Science Fiction Film, for City of Ember.

Film scores

Television series scores
Missing (48 episodes, 2003–2006)
Sanctuary (46 episodes, 2009–2011): Seasons 2–4
Primeval: New World (13 episodes, 2012–2013)
Aftermath (13 episodes, 2016)
Frontier (12 episodes, 2016-2017)
Delhi Crime (7 episodes, 2019)
Daybreak (10 episodes, 2019)
American Gods (10 episodes, 2021)
Mayor of Kingstown (10 episodes, 2021)

References

External links
 
 Official site

1974 births
Living people
People from Burlington, Ontario
Canadian film score composers
Male film score composers
Musicians from Toronto